Beyond was a Hong Kong rock band formed in 1983. The band became prominent in Hong Kong, Taiwan, Japan, Singapore, Malaysia, Mainland China, and Overseas Chinese communities. The band is widely considered as the most successful and influential Cantopop band from Hong Kong. In 1993, leader Wong Ka Kui, died at the age of 31 after an accident during the filming of a show at Fuji Television in Tokyo. Beyond continued to perform and record after Wong Ka Kui's death. In 2005, the remaining members Paul Wong, Wong Ka Keung and Yip Sai Wing decided to pursue their own solo careers, and Beyond officially disbanded.

History

Early years 
In the early 1980s, lead vocalist Wong Ka Kui and drummer Yip Sai Wing started out as young musicians who were both interested in Pink Floyd's progressive rock. In 1983, they decided to join a music contest for "Guitar magazine" and they decided to form a band with lead guitarist William Tang (鄧煒謙) and bassist Lee Wing Chiu (李榮潮). Tang wished the band's name to convey a feeling of surpassing or going beyond themselves, so the name "Beyond" was chosen. However, the band name was not definite at the time. The band's musical style was still experimental. Wong Ka Kui and Tai Chi lead guitarist Joey Tang formed a temporary band called NASA band that did art rock style of music with English pop.

In 1984, Wong's younger brother Wong Ka Keung joined the band as bassist. At the time, the band consisted of Wong Ka Kui, Yip Sai Wing, Wong Ka Keung and new lead guitarist Chan Sze On (陳時安). Chan soon had to leave for a foreign country, leaving the band without lead guitarist. In 1985 Paul Wong joined the band to replace him.

In the early years, time was difficult for the band. They had to do everything themselves, including organising its finance, selling tickets, performing and buying their own equipment. The band's first self-financed concert took place in 1985 at Caritas Centre in Hong Kong. The show was unsuccessful, but caught the attention of their first manager. He would help them raise HK$16,000, but the band was soon left with only HK$1000.

In 1986, the band rented a studio to record the album Goodbye My Dreams (再見理想). Lau Chi Yuen (劉志遠) then joined Beyond as lead guitarist and keyboardist. At the time Small island, Tat Ming Pair and Beyond made a recording together. Small island was scheduled to go to a July 1986 Pan-Asian Music Festival in Taipei, and Beyond was added to the schedule. Beyond was well liked and they joined another festival that same year. They would then sign with Kinn's Music record company.

Commercial success 
In 1987, Beyond produced the second album. The album Arabian Dancing Girls (阿拉伯跳舞女郎) was one of the band's first commercial hits. They soon were in a new music underground trend along with a few number of bands, such as Tai Chi, Cocos and Raidas. Lau Chi Yuen left the band in 1988, leaving the band with four members only.

In 1989, Beyond became the first Hong Kong band to perform in Beijing at the Capital Indoor Stadium. Since Beyond's songs were in Cantonese (instead of Mandarin), the performance was not well received by the audience. Before the stadium was filled, half the people had already left. However, they still considered the concert a success. After a couple of flops, Beyond started to gain popularity following the release of the hit song "Great Land" (大地). They would soon win their first musical awards, the 1988 Jade Solid Gold Best Ten Music Awards Presentation and 1989 RTHK Top 10 Gold Songs Awards.

In 1990, they released one of their signature songs, "Glorious Years" (光輝歲月). The song was about racism and the struggle of Nelson Mandela in South Africa. The song was a huge hit, and had a fresh sound that stood out from the sea of love songs that dominated the Cantopop scene in Hong Kong. The song was from the band's album Party of Fate (命運派對), which sold extremely well, achieving triple platinum. According to a later interview with Wong Ka-Keung, Mandela was "deeply moved" when he heard about the song during his final days in hospital.

In 1991, Beyond released another critically acclaimed song "Amani" from the album Hesitation (猶豫). The song was written during Beyond's trip to Tanzania. As suggested by the title, which means "peace" in Swahili, the song is about the plight of war-ravaged Africa and the yearning for world peace. Part of the song's lyrics were written in Swahili. The song is still often used by Hong Kong's human rights bands to spread the message of peace.

In the same year, Beyond made their first appearance on Japan's NHK station. They immediately signed with record company Amuse. Beyond started to become a more international band, and began to focus more time in Japan and Taiwan. The album Continue the Revolution (繼續革命) achieved commercial and critical success. In May 1993, Beyond released the album Rock and Roll (樂與怒) which included the song "Boundless Oceans, Vast Skies" (海闊天空). That song would become Wong Ka Kui's last song with the band.

Death of Wong Ka Kui 

Beyond arrived in Japan in January 1993 to record new material and engage in media appearances. On 24 June 1993, the band appeared at a Tokyo Fuji Television game show If Uchannan-chan is Going to Do It, We Have to Do It! . The stage platform was 2.7 to 3m high. Actor Teruyoshi Uchimura and Wong Ka Kui both fell off a broken stage and sustained massive head injuries. Wong was sent to the Tokyo Women's Medical University hospital. He fell into a coma and died one week later at aged 31.

The death occurred at the prime of the band's career, with the tremendously successful song "Boundless Oceans, Vast Skies" released around the time. His funeral procession caused traffic in various major streets in Hong Kong to come to a standstill, and many top Hong Kong Cantopop singers of the time attended and paid tribute at the funeral.  Criticisms followed that the Japanese were having too many late night shows of this type, and the TV station crews were overworked.

Post Ka Kui era 
There was debate as to whether the remaining three members should continue to record and perform as Beyond. Eventually, they reappeared on 30 November 1993 in Hong Kong at the Composer's Tribute Night concert. In the new era their albums have a more alternative rock feel, unlike the progressive rock sound of previous albums. Beyond's first album in the post Ka Kui era was 2nd Floor Back Suite (二樓後座). In 1997 the album Please Let Go of Your Hands also made a reference to Hong Kong's cultural changes after the handover of Hong Kong to China.

In November 1999, the three remaining Beyond members announced that they would pursue their own solo career after a world tour. In 2003 for the band's 20th anniversary, they came out to embark on a world tour.  The tour included stops in Toronto Canada, and various cities in mainland China.

In 2005, they played their last tour (The Story Live 2005) under the name Beyond and announced their disbandment at their last stop in Singapore.

For the first time in three years, the three remaining members of Beyond reunited to play "Boundless Oceans, Vast Skies" for the Wong Ka Kui Memorial Concert. The concert was organised by Wong Ka Keung as a birthday tribute to his brother 15 years after his death which featured covers of Ka Kui's songs by bands and artists such as Kolor, Tai Chi, Soler and at17.

Yip Sai Wing and Paul Wong held a concert called "Beyond Next Stage Live 2008" on 11 Oct 2008 in Genting Highlands, Malaysia and later on 8 November 2008 at the Singapore Indoor Stadium.

In 2009, Wong Ka Keung and Paul Wong held a series of concerts called "This is Rock & Roll" between 24 July and the 26th in Hong Kong.

Legacy 
The song "Boundless Oceans, Vast Skies" has been used in many charity events. For example, the song's lyrics was modified and used for the massive Artistes 512 Fund Raising Campaign after the 2008 Sichuan earthquake.

The original lyrics of the song "Boundless Oceans, Vast Skies" epitomizes the untamed pursuit of ideals and freedom despite obstacles. The song is widely sung by the protesters in the 2014 Hong Kong protests, which aim to fight for the implementation of universal suffrage in accordance with the Hong Kong Basic Law and Sino-British Joint Declaration.

The song "Glorious Years" is also used as the theme song for Hong Kong's political activities. For example, the song was used for Hong Kong's Five Constituencies Referendum where the pan-democrats tried to push for a by-election.

Members

Principal members 
Quartet period
 Wong Ka Kui – lead vocals, guitar (1983–1993; died 1993)
 Yip Sai Wing – drums, percussion, vocals (1983–1999, 2003–2005)
 Wong Ka Keung – bass guitar, vocals (1984–1999, 2003–2005)
 Paul Wong – guitar, backing vocals (1985–1999, 2003–2005)

Trio period
 Paul Wong – lead vocals, guitar (1985–1999, 2003–2005)
 Wong Ka Keung – lead vocals, bass guitar, guitar (1984–1999, 2003–2005)
 Yip Sai Wing – lead vocals, drums, percussion (1983–1999, 2003–2005)

Early members 
 Lau Chi Yuen (劉志遠) – guitar, keyboards (1986–1988)
 William Tang (鄧煒謙) – guitar (1983)
 Li Wing Chiu (李榮潮) – bass guitar (1983)
 Owen Kwan (關寶璇) – guitar (1983–1984)
 David Chan (陳時安) – guitar (1984–1985)

Roadie
 Wong Chung Yin (黃仲賢) – guitar (1996, 1997, 2003, 2005)

Timeline

Discography 
 Goodbye Ideal (再見理想) (1986)
 Waiting Forever (EP) (永遠等待) (1987)
 New World (新天地) (EP) (1987)
 Arabian Dancing Girls (阿拉伯跳舞女郎) (1987)
 A Lonely Kiss (孤單一吻) (single) (1987)
 Modern Stage (現代舞台) (1987)
 Yesterday's Footprints (舊日的足跡) (1988)
 Secret Police (秘密警察) (1988)
 Beyond IV (1989)
 Real Testament (真的見證) (1989)
 If Heaven Have Feelings (天若有情) (E.P.) (1990)
 Great Earth (大地) (Mandarin) (1990)
 Victorious Against Personal Demons (戰勝心魔) (E.P.) (1990)
 Party of Fate (命運派對) (1990)
 Glorious Years (光輝歲月) (Mandarin) (1991)
 Hesitation (猶豫) (1991)
 Continue the Revolution (繼續革命) (1992)
 Endless Emptiness (無盡空虛) (EP) (1992)
 Beyond Belief (信念) (Mandarin) (1992)
 Rock and Roll (樂與怒) (1993)
 2nd Floor Back Suite (二樓後座) (1994)
 Paradise (Mandarin) (1994)
 Sound (1995)
 Love & Life (愛與生活) (Mandarin) (1995)
 Beyond Splendid (Beyond得精彩) (EP) (1996)
 Please Let Go of Your Hands (請將手放開) (1997)
 Surprise (驚喜) (1997)
 Here & There (Mandarin) (這裏那裏) (1998)
 Until You Arrive (不見不散) (1998)
 Action EP (1998)
 Good Time (1999)
 Together (EP) (2003)
 Beyond 20th Anniversary 2003 Live (2003)
 Beyond: The Ultimate Story (2004)
 Beyond The Story Live 2005 (2005)
 Beyond No. 1 Compilation (2006)
 Beyond 25th Anniversary (2008)

Filmography 
 Sworn Brothers (1987) (cameo)
 No Regret (靚妹正傳) (1987) (cameo)
 The Black Wall (黑色迷牆) (1989) (cameo)
 The Fun, the Luck & the Tycoon (1990) (actors)
 Happy Ghost IV (1990) (actors)
 Teenage Mutant Ninja Turtles (1990) (Cantonese voice dub)
 Beyond's Diary (Beyond日記之莫欺少年窮) (1991) (actors)
 The Banquet (1991) (cameo)
 Teenage Mutant Ninja Turtles 2 (1991) (Cantonese voice dub)

See also 
 C-Rock/Sino-Rock

References

External links 
 Beyond Music

 
 Beyond, hkvpradio

 
Hong Kong musical groups
Rock music groups
Cantopop musical groups
Mandopop musical groups
Musical groups established in 1983
Musical groups disestablished in 1999
Musical groups reestablished in 2003
Musical groups disestablished in 2005
1983 establishments in Hong Kong
Musical quartets
Musical quintets
Musical trios
Sibling quartets